Mitchell Powerhouse and Dam is a historic structure located in Mitchell, Iowa, United States. The west side of town along the Cedar River developed into a processing and manufacturing area, and its mills were powered by the river's current. They all became obsolete and closed around the turn of the 20th-century. In 1917 the Northeastern Iowa Power Co. was incorporated at Clermont, Iowa, and in 1924 they hired the Fargo Engineering Company of Jackson, Michigan to build the powerhouse and dam at Mitchell. It was completed the following year. A third gate was converted into a permanent concrete spillway. The powerhouse is a single-story structure composed of rock faced limestone that was laid in a random ashlar pattern. Northeastern Iowa Power Company was transferred to the Central States Power and Light Company, who was in turn transferred to the Interstate Power Company. The Mitchell County Conservation Board acquired the dam, powerhouse, and the adjacent land, which it turned into a public park in 1963. The facility was listed on the National Register of Historic Places in 1978.

References

Dams completed in 1925
Dams on the National Register of Historic Places in Iowa
National Register of Historic Places in Mitchell County, Iowa
Buildings and structures in Mitchell County, Iowa
Hydroelectric power plants in Iowa
Energy infrastructure on the National Register of Historic Places